Ivica Žurić (born 9 January 1965 in Šibenik, Croatia) is a former Croatian professional basketball player. He was a versatile 2.06 m (6'9") tall power forward.

Professional career
Žurić competed in the EuroLeague for many years, wearing the jersey of Cibona Zagreb.

Croatian national team
Žurić was a member of the senior men's Croatian national team. With Croatia, he won the bronze medal at the 1994 FIBA World Championship, the bronze medal at the 1993 EuroBasket, and the bronze medal at the 1995 EuroBasket.

External links 
FIBA Europe Profile

1965 births
Living people
Basketball players from Šibenik
Croatian men's basketball players
Yugoslav men's basketball players
KK Cibona players
KK Šibenik players
Small forwards
KK Zagreb players
Power forwards (basketball)
1994 FIBA World Championship players